Kassama  is a village and commune in the Cercle of Kéniéba in the Kayes Region of south-western Mali. The commune includes 23 villages and in the 2009 census had a population of 19,230.

References

External links
.

Communes of Kayes Region